St. John's School is a public English Primary and Secondary school located in Saint-Jean-sur-Richelieu, Quebec, Canada.

History

In the politically charged atmosphere of Quebec's Bill 101 debate, the school was the target of an arson attack during the 1988 winter break. The fire burned the main office and postponed school restarting in the 1989 new year.

In 1991, the school's athletic program adopted the team name St John's Knights, an allusion to the Knights of St John.

See also
 Saint-Jean-sur-Richelieu
 Riverside School Board
 Heritage Regional High School
 Centennial Regional High School

References

External links
 St. Johns School
 RSB St. Johns profile

English-language schools in Quebec
Elementary schools in Montérégie
High schools in Montérégie
Riverside School Board
Education in Saint-Jean-sur-Richelieu
Buildings and structures in Saint-Jean-sur-Richelieu
School buildings in Canada destroyed by arson